Boccioleto is a comune (municipality) in the Province of Vercelli in the Italian region Piedmont, located about  northeast of Turin and about  northwest of Vercelli.

Boccioleto borders the following municipalities: Alto Sermenza, Balmuccia, Campertogno, Mollia,   Rossa, Scopa, and Scopello.

Twin towns — sister cities
Boccioleto is twinned with:

  Baia de Fier, Romania (2007)

References

External links
 Official website

Cities and towns in Piedmont